Sam Stitt (born September 28, 1981, in Arlington County, Virginia) is an American rower. He rowed for and graduated from McLean High School in McLean, Virginia before attending Rutgers university. He finished 5th in the men's quadruple sculls at the 2008 Summer Olympics.

References 
 
 

1981 births
Living people
People from Arlington County, Virginia
American male rowers
Rowers at the 2008 Summer Olympics
Olympic rowers of the United States
Rowers at the 2015 Pan American Games
Pan American Games competitors for the United States